Scott Bessent (born 1962) is a prominent American investor, philanthropist, and educator. He is the founder of Key Square Group, a global macro investment firm which was one of the largest hedge fund launches of all time.

Early life and education 
Bessent was born in Conway, South Carolina. He attended Yale College, graduating in 1984. He originally intended to become a computer scientist or journalist, but switched to finance when his passion for investing was sparked by an internship with renowned money manager Jim Rogers. While at Yale, Bessent wrote for The Yale Daily News, was President of Wolf's Head Society and Treasurer for the class of 1984.

Investment career 
Throughout his career, Bessent helped orchestrate some of the most legendary bets in markets history. The Wall Street Journal hailed him as “one of the most powerful investors on Wall Street.” Bessent was featured in Crain's “40 Under 40,” which proclaimed, “If hedge fund managers are the rock stars of Wall Street, Scott Bessent is the front man.” He is a frequent speaker on economic and investment panels around the globe. The Australian Financial Review noted that “In the world of macro hedge funds, Scott Bessent could be regarded as royalty.”

Bessent was previously the Chief Investment Officer of Soros Fund Management, the $30 billion family office of billionaire George Soros. From 2006 to 2011, Bessent was an Adjunct Professor of economic history at Yale, where he taught three courses. The Daily Beast included his 2010 class in its listing of “Hottest College Courses.”

Initial investment experience 
Bessent was fortunate to have been mentored by some of the greats in the investment management business. After beginning his career at Brown Brothers Harriman, he moved to the Olayan Group, a Saudi family office where he reported directly to Hutham Olayan. From there, he became the first analyst for acclaimed short seller Jim Chanos at Kynikos Associates.

First stint at Soros Fund Management 
Bessent first joined Soros Fund Management (SFM) in 1991 and was a partner there throughout the 1990s. At the age of 29, he was asked to head SFM's London office. He was one of the two youngest Managing Directors at the firm.

According to Sebastian Mallaby's history of hedge funds, More Money Than God, Bessent's analytics played a key role in helping George Soros and Stan Druckenmiller construct SFM's fabled wager against the British pound, which netted the firm a profit of $1 billion (see “Further reading”).

In addition to heading the London office, Bessent served as SFM's head of global research and co-head of external manager selection.2,3,5,16 He also directly managed $1.5 billion of the firm's capital.

By the time he decided to leave SFM in 2000, an SFM memo described Bessent as “a trusted advisor for nearly a decade.”

Other ventures 
After resigning from SFM in 2000, Bessent founded a $1 billion hedge fund, which he converted to a family office in 2005. He was also a senior investment advisor at fund-of-funds Protégé Partners.

Bessent was in the process of starting a new fund in the summer of 2011 when George Soros asked him to return to SFM as CIO.

CIO at Soros Fund Management 
Bessent served as the Chief Investment Officer of Soros Fund Management from 2011 to 2015. Under Bessent's leadership, the firm made a profit of $10 billion. In February 2013, Bessent was credited with helping Soros Fund Management make more than $1.2 billion in profits, in part by betting that the Japanese yen would weaken against other major currencies. Bessent had a reputation for the strength of his convictions, holding onto his investment theses even when they differed from those of George Soros.

In August 2015, it was announced that Bessent would be leaving Soros Fund Management to start his new firm, Key Square Group, with $2 billion of George Soros's money. In addressing his departure, an SFM memo praised his skill and dedication, noting that “Scott will continue to advise SFM on an informal basis and remains close to George Soros and the Soros family.”

Key Square Group 
Key Square Group was the largest hedge fund launch of 2016 and, at that time, the third-largest hedge fund launch ever. The firm's name alludes to the pivotal position for a player's king during the endgame in chess.

Bessent founded Key Square Group with Michael Germino, who had been the Global Head of Capital Markets at SFM. A number of the pair's former colleagues from SFM followed them to Key Square.

Key Square received a $2 billion anchor investment from George Soros. By the end of its first quarter of operation, Key Square was managing $4.5 billion from a close-knit group of trusted investors. The firm was oversubscribed at launch, and had to turn away some capital.

At the end of 2017, Key Square's assets were $5.1 billion. Bloomberg in May 2018 reported that Key Square had mostly outperformed rival macro managers and continued to generate significant investor interest. As part of a pre-arranged deal, the firm gradually returned the Soros capital as it took in other assets. Its investors include Australia's sovereign wealth fund.

Philanthropy 
Bessent has been very active at his alma mater, Yale University, where he sits on the University Council. He and his sister donated the Bessent Library to Yale in honor of their father, H. Gaston Bessent, Jr. Bessent has also endowed three scholarships at Yale, including one for students who are first-generation college matriculants, one for students from South Carolina, and one for students from the Bronx.

Bessent previously served on the board of God's Love We Deliver, an organization founded to deliver meals for homebound people with AIDS. He is a supporter of The Harlem Children's Zone, where he has chaired their annual dinner and mentors recent graduates.

Bessent currently serves on the board of trustees of Rockefeller University, where he chairs the Investment Committee and is a member of the Executive Committee. He is vice-chair of Classical American Homes Preservation Trust, and a former board member of the Spoleto Festival in Charleston, South Carolina. Bessent is also a member of the Council on Foreign Relations.

Personal life 
Bessent resides in Manhattan with his husband, a former New York City assistant district attorney, and two children. He has been identified as the most prominent gay hedge fund manager on Wall Street.

Bessent is featured in several books on hedge funds and a number of his articles have been published in The International Economy Magazine.<ref>'Is the World at Risk of the “Japan Disease”?''' The International Economy Magazine, Summer 2017.  http://www.international-economy.com/TIE_Su17_JapanDiseaseSymp.pdf</ref><ref>'Is the World Ready For the Next Downturn?' The International Economy Magazine, Summer 2018.  http://www.international-economy.com/TIE_Su18_ReadyDownturnSymp.pdf</ref>

 References 

Further reading

Steven Drobny, "The Stock Operator: Scott Bessent," Inside the House of Money

Sebastian Mallaby, More Money Than God: Hedge Funds and the Making of a New Elite''

American money managers
Living people
1962 births